The red-lipped batfish or Galapagos batfish (Ogcocephalus darwini) is a fish of unusual morphology found around the Galapagos Islands and off Peru at depths of . Red-lipped batfish are closely related to rosy-lipped batfish (Ogcocephalus porrectus), which are found near Cocos Island off the Pacific coast of Costa Rica. This fish is mainly known for its bright red lips. Batfish are not good swimmers; they use their highly adapted pectoral, pelvic and anal fins to "walk" on the ocean floor. When the batfish reaches maturity, its dorsal fin becomes a single spine-like projection (thought to function primarily as a lure for prey).

Diet
The species is a piscivore/invertivore, mainly feeding on other small fish and small invertebrates including shrimp, crabs, worms and mollusks.

Description
Its body color is light brown and a greyish colour on its back, with white countershading on the underside. On the top side of the batfish, there is usually a dark brown stripe starting at the head and going down the back to the tail. The snout and horn of the red-lipped batfish is a brownish color. As the name of the fish states, the batfish has bright, almost fluorescent, red lips. The color of the squamation of the red-lipped batfish is shagreen-like with a relatively smooth texture. The bucklers are concealed by a layer of fine spinules.

When compared to the porrectus, the red-lipped batfish has a shorter disk perimeter but a higher fibre pectoral fin ray count. Regarding the number of scales along the lateral line, there are four to nine subopercular scales, six to nine on the cheek, usually. The red-lipped batfish has around 19-20 vertebrae.

On the top of the batfish's head there is a special body part that extends outward called an illicium. After the red-lipped batfish fully matures, its dorsal fin becomes a single spine-like projection that comes out of the top of the head. The batfish uses the illicium as a way to lure prey near them.

At the top of its illicium is an esca. The esca emits a bright light and since these fish dwell in deep waters, the light lures other fish to where the batfish is positioned. The esca lures the prey to the batfish which then allows it to eat those small creatures which fall into its trap.

Red-lipped batfish have extremely bright red lips, which allows people to distinguish them from other batfish. Marine biologists believe that the bright red lips of the red-lipped batfish may be used to enhance species recognition during spawning. It is also believed that exposing their lips can attract sexual tension within the species.

Habitat
It has been noted before that a few specimens of red-lipped batfish were found in fishnets in California, but all these types of sightings are extremely rare, and could very well be another type of batfish. They are bottom dwellers, so they are usually found within the sand or ocean floor. Although they are considered shallow-water forms, they occasionally come to the surface over deep water. They tend to associate themselves with the edges of reefs up to about 120 m deep.

Predators
The red-lipped batfish has no known direct threats. However, rising sea temperatures and coral bleaching could pose a threat, as it would alter the natural habitat and may cause a decline in the availability of a natural food source.

References

External links
 
 About fish online
 

Ogcocephalidae
Galápagos Islands coastal fauna
Fish described in 1958